Hamilton Glacier is a glacier about  long flowing from the northwest slopes of Markham Plateau in the Queen Elizabeth Range of Antarctica into Nimrod Glacier. It was named by the northern party of the New Zealand Geological Survey Antarctic Expedition (1960–61) for W.M. Hamilton, Secretary of the New Zealand Department of Scientific and Industrial Research.

References

Glaciers of Shackleton Coast